Robert Milligan (1892 – 25 September 1915) was a Scottish amateur footballer who played in the Scottish Football League for Clyde.

Personal life 
Milligan worked at Douglas Park Colliery near Bellshill. After the outbreak of the First World War in August 1914, Milligan enlisted as a private in the Seaforth Highlanders. He was killed in action during the Battle of Loos on 25 September 1915. He was commemorated on the Loos Memorial.

References 

Scottish footballers
1915 deaths
British Army personnel of World War I
British military personnel killed in World War I
1892 births
Footballers from Dumfries and Galloway
Seaforth Highlanders soldiers
Scottish Football League players
Clyde F.C. players
Scottish miners
Association footballers not categorized by position